Abdallı (also, Abdally and Avdally) is a village in the Oghuz Rayon of Azerbaijan.  The village forms part of the municipality of Xaçmaz.

References

External links
Satellite map at Maplandia.com

Populated places in Oghuz District